The Kyoto Prize in Advanced Technology is awarded once a year by the Inamori Foundation. The Prize is one of three Kyoto Prize categories; the others are the Kyoto Prize in Basic Sciences and the Kyoto Prize in Arts and Philosophy. The first Kyoto Prize in Advanced Technology was awarded to Rudolf E. Kálmán, the "creator of modern control and system theory". The Prize is widely regarded as the most prestigious award available in fields which are traditionally not honored with a Nobel Prize.

Fields 
The Kyoto Prize in Advanced Technology is awarded on a rotating basis to researchers in the following four fields: 
 Electronics
 Biotechnology and Medical Technology
 Materials Science and Engineering
 Information Science

Laureates 
Source: Kyoto Prize

Electronics

Biotechnology and medical technology

Materials science and engineering

Information science

See also 
 Kyoto Prize
 Kyoto Prize in Basic Sciences
 Kyoto Prize in Arts and Philosophy
 List of Kyoto Prize winners
 List of computer-related awards
 List of computer science awards

References 

Kyoto Prize
Japanese science and technology awards
Information science awards
Computer-related awards
Kyoto laureates in Advanced Technology